Ridheema Tiwari is an Indian television actress. She is known for her roles of Rasika in Do Dil Ek Jaan, Disha in Sasural Genda Phool, and Maldawali in Life OK's Series Ghulaam. She is also known for her Bollywood Debut in 2017 for film Begum Jaan.

Television

Films
 Begum Jaan as Amba

References

External links

Living people
Indian television actresses
1984 births
Actresses from Uttar Pradesh